The 2007 USG Sheetrock 400 was the 19th race of the 2007 NASCAR Nextel Cup Series season.  It took place during daytime on July 15, 2007, at Chicagoland Speedway in Joliet, Illinois with the broadcast airing on TNT.

Background

Qualifying 
Unlike the previous week at Daytona, qualifying was complete for this race.  Casey Mears won the pole position with a lap of 182.556 miles per hour.  Michael Waltrip qualified for only his fourth race of the season.  Chad Chaffin once again filled in at BAM Racing and again qualified for the race.

Race
Tony Stewart won for the first time in 2007 and for the 30th time in his career.  He also led the most laps in the competition, 108 out of 267.  His margin of victory over second-place Matt Kenseth was 1.727 seconds.  The rest of the top five drivers, in order, were Carl Edwards, Kevin Harvick, and Clint Bowyer.

Jimmie Johnson led the second-most laps (82), but encountered tire trouble toward the end and wound up in 37th place.

Jeff Gordon (9th) extended his points lead over Denny Hamlin (17th) to 303 points.  Dale Earnhardt Jr. led Ryan Newman by 39 points for 12th place and the final spot in the 2007 Chase for the NEXTEL Cup.  After this race, seven races remained until the "playoff" field was set.

Results

Notes
The command to start the engines was given by former Chicago Bears head coach Lovie Smith.
This was the final race in the telecast schedule for TNT.  Kyle Petty, who was one of the color analysts, returned to the #45 car for the Allstate 400 at the Brickyard.
On the Friday of the race weekend, NASCAR announced that Robby Gordon had lost 25 driver points and 25 owner points because the camera shell, a part that allows in-car images to be sent to television viewers, was not approved.
The 2007 race was the last daytime race in Joliet until 2011. It was announced that starting in 2008, the race would be moved to Saturday night as lights would be installed.

References

External links
Complete race results 
Points standings 

USG Sheetrock 400
USG Sheetrock 400
NASCAR races at Chicagoland Speedway
July 2007 sports events in the United States